UFC on Fox: Emmett vs. Stephens (also known as UFC on Fox 28) was a mixed martial arts event produced by the Ultimate Fighting Championship held on February 24, 2018, at Amway Center in Orlando, Florida, United States.

Background
The event marked the promotion's third visit to Orlando, and first since UFC on Fox: dos Anjos vs. Cowboy 2 in December 2015.

The event was headlined by a featherweight bout between Josh Emmett and Jeremy Stephens.

Jéssica Andrade and Karolina Kowalkiewicz were expected to face in each other in a bout of former UFC Women's Strawweight Championship challengers. However, on December 27, it was announced that Tecia Torres would be Andrade's opponent instead.

Jake Collier was expected to face promotional newcomer Marcin Prachnio at the event. However, Collier pulled out of the fight in early January citing injury. Prachnio faced Sam Alvey.

Current Invicta FC Bantamweight Champion Yana Kunitskaya was expected to face 2004 Olympic silver medalist in wrestling and former UFC Women's Bantamweight Championship challenger Sara McMann at the event. However, on January 10, it was announced that McMann would face Marion Reneau instead, after Reneau's original opponent former Invicta FC Bantamweight Champion and UFC Women's Featherweight Championship challenger Tonya Evinger pulled out of their scheduled bout a week earlier at UFC Fight Night: Cowboy vs. Medeiros.

Former middleweight interim title challenger (as well as 2000 Olympic silver medalist and former world champion in freestyle wrestling) Yoel Romero was expected to face former WSOF Middleweight and Light Heavyweight Champion David Branch at the event. However, on January 13, it was announced that current UFC Middleweight Champion Robert Whittaker pulled out of his title defense against former Strikeforce and UFC Middleweight Champion Luke Rockhold at UFC 221 due to injury and was replaced by Romero. Due to that change, Branch was rescheduled for a future event.

Ilir Latifi was expected to face former interim UFC Light Heavyweight Championship challenger Ovince Saint Preux at UFC on Fox: Jacaré vs. Brunson 2. However, on January 16, Latifi pulled out due to injury and the bout was scrapped. The pairing was then rescheduled for this event.

Gadzhimurad Antigulov was expected to face Aleksandar Rakić at the event. However, Antigulov pulled out of the fight on February 7, and the bout was scrapped.

On February 21, it was announced that a lightweight bout between Gilbert Burns and Olivier Aubin-Mercier was pulled from the event after the medical team deemed unsafe for Burns to cut the necessary weight for the 156-pound limit.

At the weigh-ins, Alex Perez weighed in at 126.5 pounds, a half pound over the flyweight non-title fight upper limit of 126 pounds. As a result, the bout proceeded at catchweight and Perez was fined 20% of his purse which went to his opponent Eric Shelton.

Results

Bonus awards
The following fighters were awarded $50,000 bonuses:
Fight of the Night: Alan Jouban vs. Ben Saunders
Performance of the Night: Jeremy Stephens and Ilir Latifi

Reported payout
The following is the reported payout to the fighters as reported to the Florida State Boxing Commission. It does not include sponsor money and also does not include the UFC's traditional "fight night" bonuses. The total disclosed payout for the event was $1,173,000.

 Jeremy Stephens: $126,000 (includes $63,000 win bonus) def. Josh Emmett: $45,000
 Jéssica Andrade: $96,000 (includes $48,000 win bonus) def. Tecia Torres: $36,000
 Ilir Latifi: $66,000 (includes $33,000 win bonus) def. Ovince Saint Preux: $86,000
 Max Griffin: $24,000 (includes $12,000 win bonus) def. Mike Perry: $40,000
 Brian Kelleher: $40,000 (includes $20,000 win bonus) def. Renan Barão: $53,000 
 Marion Reneau: $56,000 (includes $28,000 win bonus) def. Sara McMann: $38,000
 Angela Hill: $42,000 (includes $21,000 win bonus) def. Maryna Moroz: $23,000
 Alan Jouban: $80,000 (includes $40,000 win bonus) def. Ben Saunders: $23,000
 Sam Alvey: $92,000 (includes $46,000 win bonus) def. Marcin Prachnio: $25,000
 Rani Yahya: $92,000 (includes $46,000 win bonus) def. Russell Doane: $22,000
 Alex Perez: $21,600 (includes $12,000 win bonus) def. Eric Shelton: $14,400 ^
 Manny Bermudez: $20,000 (includes $15,000 win bonus) def. Albert Morales: $15,000

^ Perez was fined $2,400, 20 percent of his purse for failing to make the required weight for his fight with Eric Shelton.

See also

List of UFC events
2018 in UFC

References

Fox UFC
Events in Orlando, Florida
Mixed martial arts in Florida
Sports competitions in Orlando, Florida
2018 in mixed martial arts
February 2018 sports events in the United States